Shyam Srinivasan (born 2 February 1962) took charge as the Managing Director & Chief Executive Officer of The Federal Bank Ltd, a major private commercial bank in India, on 23 September 2010.

He has spent over 20 years with leading multinational banks in India, Middle East and South East Asia, working primarily in retail lending, wealth management and SME banking. Previously he has worked at WIPRO, Citi Bank and Standard Chartered, where he has also served on the Global Executive Forum (the top 100 executives) of Standard Chartered Bank from 2004 to 2010.

At Federal Bank, he is a major driving force behind the bank's digitalization and coined the mantra of Digital at the fore, Human at the core. This has since become the driving philosophy behind all of the digitalization efforts of the bank.

Education 
Srinivasan got his Bachelor of Engineering (B.E.) degree from Regional Engineering College, Tiruchirappalli (now known as National Institute of Technology, Tiruchirappalli) and his PGDM from Indian Institute of Management, Calcutta. He has done a Leadership Development Program from the London Business School.

Career

Federal Bank Ltd 
He focused on increasing the bank's visibility nationally, and improving the quality of customer-centric processes. During this time, Federal Bank achieved over INR 3 trillion of business and has been conferred several recognitions such as Outlook Money Awards, Great Place To Work Certification and India’s Best Mid-Sized Bank, among others. Federal Bank's board approved issuance of shares to the IFC Group to an extent of 4.99 percent of the bank's paid-up capital. With this, IFC, a member of the World Bank group, became a significant shareholder of the bank.

Federal Bank upgraded their CSR initiatives across sectors. These include: Initiatives aimed at up-skilling the needy and making such candidates employable (Federal Skill Academy), programs that help platform and empower young thinkers (Speak For India). The academy, which is a part of the bank's Corporate Social Responsibility (CSR) initiatives aims at up skilling the needy and making such candidates employable. A women-led pan-India motorbike expedition to fight gender stereotypes, initiatives to support communities throughout the pandemic, and India's biggest vaccination awareness drive ‘Sanjeevani’ in association with Network 18.

Federal Bank shareholders have approved the motion to re-appoint Shyam Srinivasan as the managing director and chief executive officer of the lender for a period of three years. His reappointment has come into effect from September 23, 2021, to September 22, 2024.

Other Key positions  
 Member of the Managing Committee of IBA.
 Member of the Board of Governors of the Development and Innovation Strategic Council of Kerala (DISC).
 Member of the committee on Financial Sector Legislative Reforms set up by Reserve Bank of India.
 Past Chairman of Kerala State Council of Confederation of Indian Industries.
 Honorary fellow & governing council member of Indian Institute of Banking and Finance.
 Chairman of Policyholder Protection Committee of IDBI Federal.
 Alternate Chairman in the following committees of the Indian Bank's Association.
 Committee on Risk Management and Basel Implementation.
 Agro Business and MSME.

Awards and honors
Shri Shyam Srinivasan has been conferred upon the following awards and recognitions in the recent past:

 Business Standard Banker of the Year 2020
 India's top 50 Best Leaders in times of Crises 2021’ by the Great Place to Work Institute
 Best Banker of the Year 2020 by the State Forum of Bankers Clubs (SFBC), Kerala
 The Greatest Corporate Leaders Of India Award given away by the World HRD Congress 
 Exemplary Leadership Award from the Rotary Club.
 Rashtriya Udyog Ratna Award instituted by the NEHRDO.
 Distinguished Alumnus Award 2017 of IIM Calcutta
 Recipient of Distinguished Alumnus Award of NIT, Trichy.

See also
 Federal Bank
Awards
Membership
Other Links

References

Living people
Indian Institute of Management Calcutta alumni
Indian chief executives
Indian bankers
National Institute of Technology, Tiruchirappalli alumni
Federal Bank
1962 births